The San Jose Obrero Parish Church, also known as the Floridablanca church, is a 19th-century Neo-Gothic church located at Barangay Poblacion, Floridablanca, Pampanga, Philippines. The parish church, under the aegis of Saint Nicholas of Tolentine, is currently under the Roman Catholic Archdiocese of San Fernando.

History
Available records tell that present-day Floridablanca started as the Hacienda de San Jose de Calumpaui and had its own chapel since 1823. By 1867, a petition was signed to move the town center to its current site. The petition was approved in November of the same year and the formal inauguration of the town followed in January 1879. In 1887, Father Luciano Morros Ylla built the church and convent. Several renovations were done into the church structure before and after the turn of the century: Father Rodriguez Prado rebuilt the convent of stone and wood in 1893; Father Elifio Aparicio reinforced the church with concrete in the early quarter of the 20th century. The church became a casualty of the World War II, with only the walls withstanding the bombing of 1945. It was said that Father Francisco Mozo died as the bell tower collapsed above him during the impact. The parish was renovated and enlarged in 1967.

Architecture
The original structure measures 56 meters long, 20 meters wide and 10 meters high, with a main nave and two aisles. The style is of Pseudo-Gothic, with prominent pointed arch windows blending in with the other Neoclassical features of the facade. Besides the pointed finials on the second level of the facade and the cornices along the base and edge of the imaginary pediment, the facade is devoid of any other ornamentation. To the right of the church is the slender three-level, belfry.

References

Roman Catholic churches in Pampanga
Baroque architecture in the Philippines
Spanish Colonial architecture in the Philippines
Roman Catholic churches completed in 1887
19th-century Roman Catholic church buildings in the Philippines
Churches in the Roman Catholic Archdiocese of San Fernando